The National Library of Paraguay (in Spanish: Biblioteca Nacional del Paraguay) was created in 1887. It is the legal deposit and copyright library for Paraguay.

External links
Official website 
 Information on the library 

Government of Paraguay
Paraguay
Paraguay
Paraguayan culture
1887 establishments in Paraguay
Libraries established in 1887
Libraries in Paraguay